Nationality words link to articles with information on the nation's poetry or literature (for instance, Irish or France).

Events 
 Rhymers' Club founded in London by W. B. Yeats and Ernest Rhys as a group of like-minded poets who meet regularly and publish anthologies in 1892 and 1894; attendees include Ernest Dowson, Lionel Johnson, Richard Le Gallienne, John Davidson, Edwin Ellis, Victor Plarr, Selwyn Image, A. C. Hillier, John Todhunter, Arthur Symons, Ernest Radford and Thomas William Rolleston;  Oscar Wilde attends some meetings held in private homes
 Dove Cottage, Grasmere in the English Lake District acquired by the Wordsworth Trust.

Works published in English

United Kingdom 
 Richard Garnett, Iphigenia in Delphi
 W. S. Gilbert, Songs of a Songbird
 Rudyard Kipling, "Danny Deever", first of the Barrack-Room Ballads
 William McGonagall, Poetic Gems
 Walter Pater, Appreciations with an Essay on Style
 Mary F. Robinson, The New Arcadia
 Christina Rossetti, Poems
 Robert Louis Stevenson, Ballads
 William Watson, Wordsworth's Grave, and Other Poems
 W. B. Yeats, The Lake Isle of Innisfree (poem) first published, in The National Observer (London) on December 13 (first published in a book, The Countess Kathleen, and Various Legends and Lyrics, in 1892)

United States 
 Thomas Bailey Aldrich, Wyndham Towers
 Madison Cawein, Lyrics and Idyls
 Emily Dickinson's Poems published posthumously
 John Hay, Poems
 Joaquin Miller, In Classic Shades and Other Poems
 James Whitcomb Riley, Rhymes of Childhood
 Richard Henry Stoddard, The Lion's Cub; with Other Verse
 John Greenleaf Whittier, At Sundown

Other in English 
 Seranus, Four Ballads and a Play, Canada
 Banjo Paterson, "The Man From Snowy River", Australia

Works published in other languages

France 
 Paul Claudel, Tête d'or
 François Coppée, Paroles sinceres
 Paul Valéry, Album de vers anciens, published starting this year and ending in 1900

Other languages 
 Naim Frashëri, Lulet e verës ("Summer Flowers"), Albania
 Stefan George, Hymnen ("Hymns"), 18 poems written reflecting Symbolism; dedicated to Carl August Klein; limited, private edition; German
 Herman Gorter, Verzen ("Verses"), Netherlands
 Władysław Mickiewicz, Vie d'Adam Mickiewicz ("Life of Adam Mickiewicz"), four volumes, Poznań, Poland, published beginning this year and through 1895; written by the poet's son
 Rabindranath Tagore, Manasi, Bengal

Awards and honors

Births 
Death years link to the corresponding "[year] in poetry" article:
 2 January (21 December 1889 O.S.) – Henrik Visnapuu (died 1951), Estonian poet and dramatist
 11 January – Oswald de Andrade (died 1954), Brazilian poet and polemicist
 12 January (31 December 1889 O.S.) – Johannes Vares (Barbarus) (committed suicide 1946), Estonian poet, doctor and radical politician
 10 February – Boris Pasternak (died 1960), Russian novelist, writer and poet
 22 February – Hinatsu Kōnosuke 日夏耿之介, a pen-name of Higuchi Kunito (died 1971), Japanese poet, editor and academic known for romantic and gothic poetry patterned after English literature; fervent Roman Catholic, co-founder, with Horiguchi Daigaku and Saijo Yaso, of Shijin ("Poets") magazine
 18 May – Zora Cross (died 1964), Australian poet, novelist and journalist
 31 May – James Devaney (died 1976), Australian poet, novelist, and journalist
 15 August – Tsugi Takano 鷹野 つぎ (died 1943), Japanese novelist and poet (a woman)
 28 August – Ivor Gurney (died 1937), English composer and poet
 31 August (August 19 O.S.) – August Alle (died 1952), Estonian writer and poet
 10 September
 Marie Heiberg (died insane 1942), Estonian poet
 Franz Werfel (died 1945), Austrian-Bohemian novelist, playwright, and poet writing in German
 24 September – A. P. Herbert, (died 1971), English writer, humorist, writer of light verse, most of it appearing in Punch, lawyer and independent politician
 15 October – Álvaro de Campos (died 1935?), Portuguese poet and marine engineer, heteronym of Fernando Pessoa (born 1888)
 25 November – Isaac Rosenberg, (killed 1918), English war poet
 13 December – Dulcie Deamer (died 1972), Australian novelist, poet, journalist and actor
 Full date unknown:
 Balakavi, pen name of Tryambak Bapuji Thomare (died 1918), Indian, Marathi-language poet
 Ramanlal Vasantlal Desai (died 1954), Indian, Gujarati-language novelist, short-story writer and poet
 Sumatiben Mehta (died 1911), Indian, Gujarati-language woman poet
 Henriette Sauret (died 1976), French poet, political writer, journalist
 Jun Tanaka 田中純 (died 1966), Japanese, Shōwa period poet

Deaths 
Birth years link to the corresponding "[year] in poetry" article:
 2 January – George Henry Boker, 66 (born 1823), American poet, playwright, and diplomat
 10 August – John Boyle O'Reilly, 46 (born 1844), Irish-born poet, novelist and newspaper editor, transported as a convict to Australia and escaped to the United States
 11 August – John Henry Newman, 89 (born 1801), English Roman Catholic cardinal, theologian, author and poet
 25 August – Emily Manning ("Australie"), 45 (born 1845), Australian poet and journalist
 7 September – Mary Mackellar, 55 (born 1834), Scottish poet and translator

See also 

 19th century in literature
 19th century in poetry
 French literature of the 19th century
 List of years in literature
 List of years in poetry
 Poetry
 Symbolist poetry
 Victorian literature
 Young Poland (Polish: Młoda Polska) a modernist period in Polish arts and literature, roughly from 1890 to 1918

Notes 

19th-century poetry
Poetry